Georges Gasté (born August 30, 1869 in Paris - died in 1910 in Madurai, India) is a French Orientalist painter and photographer.

Biography 
Born Constant Georges Gasté on August 30, 1869 at 3, rue du Gindre in the 6th borough of Paris, he was born into a great painting family. His father, Henry Gasté (1845-1871), a native of Laval, was an art dealer, and was the son of Pierre Gasté (1820-1884) (Georges Gasté's grandfather) who is also an art dealer himself. He received his early art education at the Atelier Colarossi and at age 18 he enrolled at the Ecole des Beaux Arts at the Alexandre Cabanel Studio.

On a visit to Morocco, Algeria and Palestine in 1892, he marvelled at the quality of light he observed there. After this, he made the conscious decision to become an Orientalist artist. In 1893, the French Orientalist, Nasreddine Dinet noticed his work and invited him to stay at Bou Saâda in southern Algeria, where Dinet and a small group of French painters had set up an artists' colony. Fascinated by the local inhabitants, he found inspiration for his paintings, producing many portraits of them. For five years, between 1892 and 1898, he travelled across North Africa, visiting Algeria and Egypt. In 1907 he settled in Cairo. During this period, he rarely returned to his native France.

Eager to discover new horizons, Gasté sailed for India, which for him became a new source of inspiration for his paintings. In 1905, he settled in settled in Agra, the city of the Taj Mahal, in northern India. During this period, he travelled to Venice and then to Constantinople, before returning to India in 1907 and settling in Madurai. India was a major source of inspiration and there he took many photographs and executed many paintings and watercolours. This was to be the most productive period of his career.

In 1907, he was appointed as the official correspondent of the Orientalist Painters’ Society in India. In 1909, he was given rare permission to spend six months inside the great temple of Madurai. From this privilege, he produced several works, including: Le Bain des Brahmines, now in the collection of the Orsay Museum.  He became known as the painter of India.

He died, at his studio in Madurai, India from an illness on 12 September 1910.

In 2013, an exhibition entitled Georges Gasté, un Orient d’ombre et de lumière (literally "Georges Gasté, an East[ern place made up] of light and shadow"), an exhibition that has been dedicated to the Montparnasse museum in Paris.

Work
His paintings of the Orient are noted for the authenticity, warmth and emotion. In 1913, he was acknowledged posthumously as the "Indies painter."

See also

 List of Orientalist artists
 Orientalism
 Société des Peintres Orientalistes Français

References

Further reading
 Aude De Toqueville, Georges Gasté : Un Orient d'ombre et de lumière (1869-1910), Editions musée du Montparnasse 
 Aude de Tocqueville, Georges Gasté: Traquer le soleil dans l’ombre (1869-1910),["Tracking the sun in the shadows"], (French Edition), Arthaud, 2013
 Lynne Thornton, Les Orientalistes, peintres voyageurs ("The Orientalist, travelling painters"), Courbevoie, ACR edition, Poche Couleur, 1994,

1869 births
1910 deaths
19th-century French painters
20th-century French painters
20th-century French male artists
French orientalists
French male painters
French photographers
Orientalist painters
19th-century French male artists